Ivan Mariz (January 16, 1910 – May 13, 1982) was an association footballer in midfielder role. He was born in Belém, Brazil and died in Rio de Janeiro.

He played entire career (1928–1936) at Fluminense, and won one Rio de Janeiro State Championship in 1936. For Brazilian team was in the roster for the 1930 FIFA World Cup, without playing any game. He died at 72 years old.

Honours

Club
 Campeonato Carioca (1): 
Fluminense: 1936

National
 Copa Roca (2): 
Brazil: 1931, 1932

References

1910 births
1930 FIFA World Cup players
1982 deaths
Sportspeople from Belém
Brazilian footballers
Brazil international footballers
Association football midfielders
Fluminense FC players